South Portland High School is a public high school located in South Portland, Maine, United States.

The first high school in what is now South Portland was built in 1874 while the City was part of Cape Elizabeth, Maine. The school was on the 2nd floor of a new municipal building built in 1874 until that building burnt down in 1921. The current building on Highland Avenue was erected in 1952, with a gymnasium added in 1958, an annex in 1962, and an auditorium and cafeteria in 1997. It was originally built for middle (then “junior high”) school students until the high school and middle school switched building in 1960.

Renovations
The current high school building has been renovated and expanded. Renovation was approved in a 2010 referendum, and groundbreaking took place in May 2012. Over 100,000 square feet was added to the school. The first stage of expansion to the school was complete in early January 2014. On January 3, 2015, the final phase of the  renovations were completed and staff moved into the building to set up for class on January 5. In total, the project lasted 33 months and cost a total of $47.3 million. At the time, it was among the highest-price high school projects in state history and was paid for entirely without state funds.

Notable alumni
 Jim Beattie, Major League Baseball player
 Brett Brown, former head coach of the Philadelphia 76ers
 Charlie Furbush, Major League Baseball pitcher
 Edward C. Reynolds, judge, state legislator (Class of 1877)
Leigh Saufley, first woman Chief Justice of the Maine Supreme Judicial Court 2001-2020; dean of the University of Maine School of Law 2020-
 Bill Swift, Major League Baseball pitcher

References

External links
 South Portland High School website

Public high schools in Maine
High schools in Cumberland County, Maine
Education in South Portland, Maine